Buruieneşti may refer to several villages in Romania:

 Buruieneşti, a village in Bivolari Commune, Iaşi County
 Buruieneşti, a village in Doljești Commune, Neamţ County